The Leiblach is a  tributary of Lake Constance and the Rhine.

The Leiblach source is near the German municipality of Heimenkirch, flowing to the southwest. This tributary forms a part of the Austrian-German border, and below the confluence the border continues to follow the Leiblach until it eventually empties into Lake Constance between the German town of Lindau and the Austrian town of Lochau.

See also
List of rivers of Bavaria

References

Rivers of Bavaria
Rivers of Vorarlberg
Austria–Germany border
Tributaries of Lake Constance
Lindau (district)
Rivers of Austria
Rivers of Germany
International rivers of Europe
Border rivers